is a railway station is a passenger railway station in the city of Futtsu, Chiba Prefecture, Japan, operated by the East Japan Railway Company (JR East).

Lines
Takeoka Station is served by the Uchibo Line, and is located 60.2 km from the starting point of the line at Soga Station.

Layout
Takeoka Station has two opposed side platforms serving two tracks, connected by a footbridge. The station is unattended.

Platforms

History
Takeoka Station was opened on June 16, 1916. The station was absorbed into the JR East network upon the privatization of the Japan National Railways (JNR) on April 1, 1987. The station building was reconstructed in February 2007.

Passenger statistics
In fiscal 2006, the station was used by an average of 64 passengers daily

Surrounding area
 Takeoka Elementary School

See also
 List of railway stations in Japan

References

External links

 JR East Station information 

Railway stations in Japan opened in 1926
Railway stations in Chiba Prefecture
Uchibō Line
Futtsu